Pennsylvania's 32nd congressional district was one of Pennsylvania's districts of the United States House of Representatives.

Geography
The district was located on the north side of Pittsburgh, Pennsylvania, in the area formerly known as Allegheny City, Pennsylvania.

History
This district was created in 1903.  The district was eliminated in 1953.

List of representatives

References

 Congressional Biographical Directory of the United States 1774–present

32
Former congressional districts of the United States
1903 establishments in Pennsylvania
1953 disestablishments in Pennsylvania
Constituencies established in 1903
Constituencies disestablished in 1953